Manorhaven is a village in Nassau County, on the North Shore of Long Island, in New York, United States. It is considered part of the Greater Port Washington area, which is anchored by Port Washington. The population was 6,556 at the 2010 census.

The Incorporated Village of Manorhaven is located on the Cow Neck Peninsula, within the Town of North Hempstead.

History 
Manorhaven was incorporated in 1930, after news was spread that Port Washington was planning on incorporating itself as a city. The name of the village was selected by locals, who felt that it reflected the feel and nature of the area.

Geography

Manorhaven is located within the Manhasset Bay Watershed, and is located within the larger Long Island Sound/Atlantic Ocean Watershed.

Demographics

2010 census 
As of the 2010 census, there were 6,556 people in the village. The racial/ethnic breakdown is as follows: White alone - 3,447 (52.6%); Asian alone - 1,150 (17.5%); Black alone - 90 (1.4%); Two or more races - 84 (1.3%); Other race alone - 7 (0.1%); American Indian alone - 3 (0.05%). Hispanic or Latino of any race were 1,775 (27.1%) of the population.

Census 2000 
As of the census of 2000, there were 6,138 people, 2,401 households, and 1,627 families residing in the village. The population density was 13,055.6 people per square mile (5,042.3/km2). There were 2,471 housing units at an average density of 5,255.8 per square mile (2,029.9/km2). The racial makeup of the village was 76.60% White, 1.30% African American, 0.26% Native American, 13.38% Asian, 5.16% from other races, and 3.29% from two or more races. Hispanic or Latino of any race were 19.50% of the population.

There were 2,401 households, out of which 31.5% had children under the age of 18 living with them, 52.9% were married couples living together, 10.9% had a female householder with no husband present, and 32.2% were non-families. 25.7% of all households were made up of individuals, and 7.5% had someone living alone who was 65 years of age or older. The average household size was 2.56 and the average family size was 3.07.

In the village, the population was spread out, with 22.3% under the age of 18, 6.4% from 18 to 24, 36.7% from 25 to 44, 23.8% from 45 to 64, and 10.9% who were 65 years of age or older. The median age was 37 years. For every 100 females, there were 98.0 males. For every 100 females age 18 and over, there were 95.9 males.

The median income for a household in the village was $61,474, and the median income for a family was $66,744. Males had a median income of $45,733 versus $43,182 for females. The per capita income for the village was $36,254. About 7.6% of families and 8.9% of the population were below the poverty line, including 14.1% of those under age 18 and 5.8% of those age 65 or over.

Government

Village government 
As of September 2022, the Mayor of Manorhaven is John Popeleski, the Deputy Mayor is Vincent Costa, and the Village Trustees are Harry Farina, Monica Ildefonso, and Khristine Shahipour.

Representation in higher government

Town representation 
Manorhaven is located in the Town of North Hempstead's 6th Council district, which as of September 2022 is represented on the North Hempstead Town Council by Mariann Dalimonte (D–Port Washington).

Nassau County representation 
Manorhaven is located in Nassau County's 11th Legislative district, which as of September 2022 is represented in the Nassau County Legislature by Delia DiRiggi-Whitton (D–Glen Cove).

New York State representation

New York State Assembly 
Manorhaven is located within the New York State Assembly's 16th Assembly district, which as of September 2022 is represented by Gina Sillitti (D–Manorhaven).

New York State Senate 
Manorhaven is located in the New York State Senate's 7th State Senate district, which as of September 2022 is represented in the New York State Senate by Anna Kaplan (D–North Hills).

Federal representation

United States Congress 
Manorhaven is located in New York's 3rd congressional district, which as September 2022 is represented in the United States Congress by Tom Suozzi (D–Glen Cove).

United States Senate 
Like the rest of New York, Manorhaven is represented in the United States Senate by Charles Schumer (D) and Kirsten Gillibrand (D).

Politics 
In the 2016 U.S. presidential election, the majority of Manorhaven voters voted for Hillary Clinton (D).

Education

School district 
The Village of Manorhaven is located entirely within the boundaries of the Port Washington Union Free School District. As such, all children who reside within Manorhaven and attend public schools go to Port Washington's schools.

Library district 
Manorhaven is located within the boundaries of the Port Washington Library District.

Infrastructure

Transportation

Road 

Major roads in Manorhaven include Manhasset Avenue, Manorhaven Boulevard, and Shore Road/Sands Point Road. Manorhaven Boulevard underwent a major rehabilitation and beautification project in 2022.

Road layout 
The majority of the street layout in Manorhaven resembles the traditional street grid. Manhasset Avenue in the southern part of the village is a notable exception, as it traverses the grid diagonally. Many streets use street-naming conventions of Native American tribes and places (i.e.: Mohegan Avenue) and of woods (i.e.: Cottonwood Road).

Bus 

As of August 2021, Manorhaven is served by one Nassau Inter-County Express bus route: the n23.

Utilities

Natural gas 
National Grid USA provides natural gas to homes and businesses that are hooked up to natural gas lines in Manorhaven.

Power 
PSEG Long Island provides power to all homes and businesses within Manorhaven.

Sewage 
Manorhaven maintains a village sanitary sewer system, which through a contract is transferred to and treated by the Port Washington Water Pollution Control District.

Water 
Manorhaven is located within the boundaries of the Port Washington Water District, which provides the entirety of Manorhaven with water.

Notable person

 Gina Sillitti – Politician. As of August 2021, Sillitti is the area's representative in the New York State Assembly.

References

External links

 Official website

Town of North Hempstead, New York
Villages in New York (state)
Villages in Nassau County, New York
Populated coastal places in New York (state)